Lee Woo-jin is a Korean name consisting of the family name Lee (이) and the given name Woo-jin (우진). It may refer to:

 Lee Woo-jin (footballer) (born 1986), South Korean footballer
 Lee Woo-jin (Oldboy)
 Lee Woo-jin, former Produce 101 Season 2 contestant, former The East Light member
 Lee Woo-jin, former Produce X 101 contestant, Ghost9 member
 Lee Woo-jin, (born April 2, 2003), South Korean pool player